Yalu Malu Yalu 2 is a 2018 Sri Lankan Sinhalese children's film directed by Lal Priyadeva and co-produced by Nishantha Jayawardena and Malinga Srimal Weerasinghe for Randiwa Films. It is the sequel of 2016 film Mage Yalu Malu. It stars Ranjan Ramanayake, Prashani Perera in lead roles along with Teddy Vidyalankara and Nilushi Halpita. Music composed by Sarath Wickrama. It is the 1315th Sri Lankan film in the Sinhalese cinema.

Plot

Cast
 Ranjan Ramanayake
 Prashani Perera
 Teddy Vidyalankara
 Nilushi Halpita
 Sunil Premakumara
 Sureni Senarath
 Malki Fernando
 Tyrone Michael
 D.B. Gangodathenna
 Sisira Kumarathunga
 Pankaja Chandev
 Sandali Senara
 Yashod Wickramarchchi

References

External links
 Yalu Malu Yalu 2 on YouTube

2018 films
2010s Sinhala-language films